Taniela Koroi (born 8 February 1991) is a Fijian rugby union player. He was in Fiji's squad for the 2015 Rugby World Cup. He plays in the prop position.

References

1990 births
Living people
Fijian rugby union players
Fiji international rugby union players
Rugby union props
Wellington rugby union players
Auckland rugby union players